Lorena Independent School District is a public school district based in Lorena, Texas (USA).

Located in McLennan County, a small portion of the district extends into Falls County.

In 2009, the school district was rated "academically acceptable" by the Texas Education Agency.

Schools
Lorena High (Grades 9–12)
Lorena Middle (Grades 6–8)
Lorena Elementary (Grades 3–5)
Lorena Primary (Grades PK-2)

References

External links
Lorena ISD

School districts in McLennan County, Texas
School districts in Falls County, Texas